"Drip Too Hard" is a song by American rappers Lil Baby and Gunna, released by YSL Records, Quality Control Music, Motown and Capitol Records on September 12, 2018 as the lead single from their collaborative album Drip Harder (2018). It peaked at number four on the US Billboard Hot 100, becoming the highest-charting song for Gunna and the third highest-charting song for Lil Baby. The song was nominated for a Grammy at the 2020 Grammy Awards for Best Rap/Sung Performance. On September 12, 2022, the song was certified RIAA Diamond selling over 10 million copies, giving them both their first Diamond certification

Production
"Drip Too Hard" was produced by American record producer Turbo, who also served as the executive producer on the duo's mixtape Drip Harder. It features a manipulated loop of a royalty-free guitar sample by Israeli producer J.Views.

Music video
The music video was released on YouTube on October 5, 2018. The video was directed by Spike Jordan.

Charts

Weekly charts

Year-end charts

Certifications

references

2018 singles
2018 songs
Gunna (rapper) songs
Lil Baby songs
Songs written by Lil Baby
Songs written by Gunna (rapper)
Songs written by Turbo (record producer)
Song recordings produced by Turbo (record producer)
Motown singles
Capitol Records singles
[Category:Trap music songs]